Alexander Macdonell may refer to:
Alexander Macdonell of Greenfield (1782–1835), politician in Upper Canada
Alexander Macdonell (bishop of Kingston) (1762–1840), first Bishop of Kingston, Ontario
Alexander Macdonell (bishop of Alexandria-Cornwall), bishop of the Roman Catholic Diocese of Alexandria-Cornwall, 1890–1905
Alexander Macdonell (politician) (1762–1842), elected representative for Glengarry County, Ontario and soldier in the War of 1812
Alexander Ranaldson MacDonell (1773–1828), Scottish clansman
Alexander McDonell (politician) (1786–1861), politician for Northumberland County, Ontario

See also
Alexander McDonnell (disambiguation)
Alexander MacDonnell (disambiguation)